Streckenbach is a German surname. Notable people with the surname include:

Bruno Streckenbach (1902–1977), German Nazi SS general and Holocaust perpetrator
Horst Streckenbach (1925–2001), German tattoo artist
Troy Streckenbach (born 1972), American politician

German-language surnames